Sir John Atholl Bannatyne Murray-Macgregor of Macgregor, 3rd Baronet (20 January 1810 – 11 May 1851) was a Scottish baronet and colonial administrator, who served briefly as President of the British Virgin Islands in 1851.

Born on 20 January 1810, John Atholl Bannatyne Murray was the eldest son of Lieutenant-Colonel (later Major-General) Evan John Murray (1785–1841), an officer in the British Army, and his wife Lady Elizabeth Murray (1787–1846), daughter of John Murray, 4th Duke of Atholl. In 1822, his father inherited the chieftaincy of Clan Gregor and the baronetcy created for his own father in 1795; Sir Evan later served as Governor of Dominica (1831–32), Antigua and the Leeward Islands (1832–36) and Barbados and the Windward Islands (1836–41).

After his father succeeded to the baronetcy in 1822, Murray added Macgregor to his surname. On 14 November 1833, he married Mary Charlotte (died 1896), youngest daughter and co-heiress of Rear-Admiral Sir Thomas Masterman Hardy, 1st Baronet. He had several children: 
Rear-Admiral Sir Malcolm (1834–1879), who had a career in the Royal Navy and inherited the baronetcy 
Atholl (1836–1922), employed in the Indian Civil Service. He married Caroline Mary Stuart Menzies, daughter of Sir Robert Menzies, 7th Baronet.
Sir Evan (1842–1926), a civil servant who became Permanent Secretary to the Admiralty 
Alpin (1846–1899), a gentleman usher to Queen Victoria 
Emily Louisa (who married David William Murray, Viscount of Stormont) 
Mary Elizabeth.

In late 1850, Murray-Macgregor was appointed President of the British Virgin Islands. He arrived there in March 1851 and assumed office on the 24 March. He died at Government House on Tortola on 11 May 1851. His body was interred on the island in a lead coffin so that it could eventually be transported to buried in Scotland. His funeral on the Virgin Islands was attended by many and HMS Helena fired its minute guns in salute.

References

Notes

Citations 

1810 births
1851 deaths
Baronets in the Baronetage of Great Britain
Presidents of the British Virgin Islands